Chandani Padva or Chandi Padvo is an occasion when Surtis (Gujarati people from Surat) enjoy a popular local variety of sweet Ghari, Bhushu (namkin). The festival falls on a day after Sharad Poornima, the last full moon day in the Hindu calendar. The 2017 date is 6 October and date for the 2020 is 1st of November. People generally gather on the terrace with friends and family and enjoy delicious Gari and Bhushu.

References

Gujarati culture
Culture of Surat
Festivals in Gujarat
Hindu festivals
Religious festivals in India
Food and drink festivals in India
September observances
October observances